A by-election was held for the New South Wales Legislative Assembly electorate of Argyle on 31 March 1885 because of the resignation of John Gannon resigned due to ill health.

Dates

Results

John Gannon resigned due to ill health.

See also
Electoral results for the district of Argyle
List of New South Wales state by-elections

References

1885 elections in Australia
New South Wales state by-elections
1880s in New South Wales